is a professional Japanese baseball player. He plays pitcher for the Chunichi Dragons.

On 20 October 2016, Fujishima was selected as the 5th draft pick for the Chunichi Dragons at the 2016 NPB Draft and on 19 November signed a provisional contract with a ¥30,000,000 sign-on bonus and a ¥5,400,000 yearly salary.

References

External 
 NPB.jp

1998 births
Living people
Baseball people from Aichi Prefecture
Japanese baseball players
Nippon Professional Baseball pitchers
Chunichi Dragons players
People from Toyohashi